Infinite Love Songs is the debut studio album by German musician Maximilian Hecker.  It was released by Kitty-Yo in 2001.

Track listing
"Polyester"
"Sunburnt Days"
"Green Night"
"The Days Are Long And Filled With Pain"
"White"
"Cold Wind Blowing"
"Over"
"Flower Four"
"Like Them"
"Infinite Love Song"
"Let Me Out"
"Today"

References

2001 debut albums
Maximilian Hecker albums